The 9th Kansas Militia Infantry was an infantry regiment that served in the Union Army during the American Civil War.

Service
The 9th Kansas Militia Infantry was called into service on October 9, 1864. It was disbanded on October 29, 1864.

Detailed service
The unit was called into service to defend Kansas against Maj. Gen. Sterling Price's raid. Duty at Fort Leavenworth and Kansas City, Missouri.

Commander
 Colonel Frank M. Tracy

See also

 List of Kansas Civil War Units

References

Bibliography 
 Dyer, Frederick H. (1959). A Compendium of the War of the Rebellion. New York and London. Thomas Yoseloff, Publisher. .

Units and formations of the Union Army from Kansas
1864 establishments in Kansas
Military units and formations established in 1864
Military units and formations disestablished in 1864